James Bright Morgan (March 14, 1833 – June 18, 1892) was a U.S. Representative from Mississippi.

He was born near Fayetteville, Tennessee and moved with his parents to De Soto County, Mississippi in 1840,  settling in Hernando. He received an academic education and studied law. Morgan was admitted to the bar in 1857, and practiced in Hernando.

In 1857 he was elected probate judge of De Soto County and he served until 1861, the outbreak of the Civil War.

During the Civil War, Morgan enlisted in the Confederate States Army, initially as a private. He eventually received a commission and progressed through the ranks, becoming major of the Twenty-ninth Mississippi Infantry. He attained the rank of colonel before the end of the war; after he war he returned to his law practice and was once again elected probate judge of De Soto County.

Morgan was elected to the Mississippi State Senate in 1876, and served until 1878 when he became Chancellor of the third chancery district, a post he held until 1882. He was then elected as a Democrat to the Forty-ninth, Fiftieth, and Fifty-first Congresses (March 4, 1885 – March 3, 1891).

After retiring from his political career he resumed the practice of law. He died near Horn Lake, Mississippi on June 18, 1892, and was interred at Hernando Baptist Cemetery.

Morgan died when he was shot while on board a train traveling to Memphis, Tennessee; his assailant was attorney Henry Foster. Morgan and Foster had been opposing counsel in a lawsuit shortly before Morgan's death, which led to an argument between Foster and Morgan's son; Morgan responded by administering a caning to Foster.  Foster retaliated by shooting Morgan.  Foster was convicted at his first trial. After a successful appeal resulted in a retrial, he was acquitted in 1894.

References

Sources

Newspapers

External links

1833 births
1892 deaths
Confederate States Army officers
Probate court judges in the United States
Democratic Party Mississippi state senators
Mississippi state court judges
Democratic Party members of the United States House of Representatives from Mississippi
19th-century American politicians
People from Hernando, Mississippi
People from Fayetteville, Tennessee
Deaths by firearm in Mississippi
19th-century American judges